X9 may refer to:
 X9 (New York City bus)
 X9, a Metrobus route
 X-9 Shrike, a missile
 ASC X9, the ANSI Accredited Standards Committee X9 (ASC X9)
 Khors Aircompany, former IATA code
 Former IATA code for WOW air
 Secret Agent X-9, a comic strip (1934–1996) created by Dashiell Hammett
 A binary star system located in 47 Tucanae.